Anastasia Gkatsou (born 13 October 1997) is a Greek footballer who plays as a defender and has appeared for the Greece women's national team.

Career
Gkatsou has been capped for the Greece national team, appearing for the team during the 2019 FIFA Women's World Cup qualifying cycle.

References

External links
 
 
 

1997 births
Living people
Women's association football defenders
Greek women's footballers
Greece women's international footballers
PAOK FC (women) players